Tilsit is an unincorporated community in Cape Girardeau County, in the U.S. state of Missouri.

History
A post office called Tilsit was established in 1885, and remained in operation until 1906. The community took its name from Tilsit, in East Prussia.

References

Unincorporated communities in Cape Girardeau County, Missouri
Unincorporated communities in Missouri